Kavahan (also) or Gavahyn is a village de facto in the Martuni Province of the breakaway Republic of Artsakh, de jure in the Khojavend District of Azerbaijan, in the disputed region of Nagorno-Karabakh.

History 
During the Soviet period, the village was a part of the Martuni District of the Nagorno-Karabakh Autonomous Oblast.

Historical heritage sites 
Historical heritage sites in and around the village include a 16th-century khachkar, a 17th/18th-century cemetery, and the church of Surb Astvatsatsin built in 1871.

Economy and culture 
The population is mainly engaged in agriculture and animal husbandry. As of 2015, the village has a municipal building, a house of culture, the Kavahan branch of the Kolkhozashen Secondary School, and a medical centre.

Demographics 
The village has an ethnic Armenian-majority population, had 124 inhabitants in 2005, and 75 inhabitants in 2015.

References

External links 
 

Populated places in Martuni Province
Populated places in Khojavend District